Carl Magnue Johanson (1863 – August 2, 1933) was an American football player and coach, known as the "father of Cornell football". He convinced Pop Warner to attend Cornell. Johanson died at the age of 69, on August 2, 1933, in Seattle, Washington.

Head coaching record

References

See also
 

1933 deaths
1863 births
19th-century players of American football
American football tackles
Cornell Big Red football coaches
Cornell Big Red football players
Harvard Crimson football players
Williams Ephs football players
Players of American football from Seattle